Himarimã is the presumed language of the uncontacted Hi-Merimã people in Amazonas, Brazil. A contact may have happened in 2007. The language is believed to be Arawán per testimonies from the Suruwahá and Banawá.

Notes

Indigenous languages of the Americas
Unattested languages of South America
Endangered unclassified languages